Friday Night Dinner is a British sitcom which aired on Channel 4 from 2011 to 2020. It is about the Goodmans, a middle-class Jewish family who live in suburban London and is centred on them gathering for Shabbat dinner. They are often interrupted by their neighbour.

Series overview

List of episodes

Series 1 (2011)
The first series premiered on 25 February 2011.

Series 2 (2012)
The second series began airing on 7 October 2012. A Christmas special aired on Christmas Eve 2012.

Special (2012)

Series 3 (2014) 
The third series began airing on 20 June 2014.

Series 4 (2016)
The fourth series began airing on 22 July 2016.

Series 5 (2018)
The fifth series began airing on 4 May 2018.

Series 6 (2020)
The sixth and final series began broadcasting on 27 March 2020.

Home media

Notes

References

Friday Night Dinner